Slade van Staden (born 30 April 2003) is a South African-American cricketer. He made his first-class debut on 13 February 2020, for KwaZulu-Natal Inland in the 2019–20 CSA 3-Day Provincial Cup. In July 2021, he was selected to represent the United States at the U19 World Cup qualifiers. He made his List A debut on 21 March 2022, for Dolphins in the 2021–22 CSA One-Day Cup.

References

External links
 

2003 births
Living people
South African cricketers
Dolphins cricketers
KwaZulu-Natal Inland cricketers
Place of birth missing (living people)